Falun is a hamlet in central Alberta, Canada within the County of Wetaskiwin No. 10.

The community was named by John Strom after Falun, in Sweden, the native land of a large share of the early citizens. The first school opened in 1906 and the first post office opened in 1904.

Falun is home to an outdoor arena that features the boards and glass from Calgary's Scotiabank Saddledome.

Demographics 
Falun recorded a population of 25 in the 1991 Census of Population conducted by Statistics Canada.

Education 
Wetaskiwin Regional Division No. 11  operates public schools: Falun Elementary School serves primary grades, and Pigeon Lake Regional School serves secondary grades.

See also 
List of communities in Alberta
List of hamlets in Alberta

References 

Hamlets in Alberta
County of Wetaskiwin No. 10